John Walter Carpenter (22 August 1936 – 30 May 2021) was an Irish professional football referee who officiated primarily in the League of Ireland from 1964 to 1984, as well as for FIFA as a FIFA international referee from 1969 to 1984.

Career

Carpenter took up refereeing in the early 1960s when his playing career with St Patrick's Athletic was cut short by a broken leg. He progressed through the Dublin & District Schoolboys' League, the Leinster Junior League and the Athletic Union League before joining the League of Ireland panel in 1964.

Carpenter also had a distinguished career in European club competitions, refereeing 37 matches and culminating in the 1982 UEFA Cup Final. He also refereed 15 full international matches between 1970 and 1983; however, he failed to make the referee panel for the 1974 FIFA World Cup, instead being selected as a reserve referee. When the North American Soccer League was launched, Carpenter was one of a small number of European referees who were invited to officiate.

Personal life

Carpenter was born in Donnycarney, Dublin and originally worked as a butcher with Olhausen's in Talbot Street. He died at his Clontarf home on 30 May 2021, aged 84.

References

1936 births
2021 deaths
Republic of Ireland association footballers
Republic of Ireland football referees
St Patrick's Athletic F.C. players
Sportspeople from County Dublin
Association footballers not categorized by position